The Black Dakotas is a 1954 American Technicolor Western spy film directed by Ray Nazarro and produced by Columbia Pictures. Set during the American Civil War and filmed at the Iverson Movie Ranch, the film stars Gary Merrill as a cold-blooded secret agent using the war for his own ends. It also stars Wanda Hendrix and John Bromfield. The film features The Lone Ranger television series Jay Silverheels and Clayton Moore in separate roles as well as Richard Webb of Captain Midnight.

Plot
Over footage from The Man from Colorado, opening titles inform the audience that during the Civil War the Confederate States of America sent agitators to the American West to incite Indian tribes against the Federal Government to draw troops away from battles in the East.

In 1864 a stagecoach containing two passengers is attacked by an armed band who kill the driver and stop the stage.  One of the passengers, Zachary Paige offers the armed but polite band his money but is surprised when they inform him that they are not interested in his money but know his identity as a diplomatic emissary of President Abraham Lincoln sent to the Dakota Territory to negotiate a treaty with the Sioux than includes payment of $130,000 in gold to the tribe.  The band take his credentials and Paige is further surprised when his travelling companion, Brock Marsh tells him he is a secret agent of the Confederacy who will impersonate Paige in his diplomacy but will use the opportunity to break the promises and lure the Sioux into attacking the white settlements.  The leader of the band, John Lawrence, informs Paige he will be held until after Marsh completes his mission then released.  As Lawrence goes away Marsh further explains his mission in a courteous manner, then shoots and kills Paige to protect the mission to the surprise of Lawrence and his band.

Arriving in the nearest city, Marsh as Paige informs the town authorities of his mission and tells them his stage was attacked by an armed Indian band.  Marsh meets "Gimpy" Joe Woods who offers to take him to the Sioux, but Marsh chooses Daugherty to take him.  Before their departure a posse bring in John Lawrence who they have identified as a Confederate agent and seek to lynch him. The lynch mob becomes an impromptu court run by Judge Baker who try Lawrence for treason on the spot and sentence him to hanging.  Gimpy implores Marsh as Paige to use his Federal authority to make the case a Federal matter and delay Lawrence's fate to a trial by Federal authorities.  Marsh refuses, and Lawrence is hanged in front of his daughter Ruth, who swears vengeance on the town and its population. Gimpy takes Marsh aside and reveals himself as Lawrence's second in command and asks him why he did not save Lawrence with Marsh replying that his mission is more important to the Confederacy.

Daugherty informs Marsh that though Chief War Cloud is a reasonable man his son Black Buffalo desires the extermination of all whites.  Proving his point, the pair are attacked by a war party led by Black Buffalo where his brother is killed by a proficient pistol shot by Marsh.  The pair split up where Daugherty escapes but Marsh is captured.  When Marsh realises Black Buffalo is not interested in the peace treaty and will burn him alive the clever Marsh shames the Indians that they are cowards and will be punished in the afterlife for not giving a prisoner a fair and sporting chance for his life.  Marsh is pitted against a brave, both armed with knives in a fight to the death that Marsh wins by throwing his knife into the brave's back gaining him time for a rescue by Daugherty's posse.

Upon return to the town where Marsh intends to buy drinks for the posse he is called into the office of Judge Baker and Marshal Collins who show him the body of the real Paige who was buried in a shallow grave dug up by coyotes.  As he is dressed as an Easterner and not dressed for riding the only possible way he could have come to the area would be as a passenger on the stage that Marsh came in on.  Marsh denies he had a travelling companion; as the Marshal and Judge examine the body they find a label in the dead man's jacket with the name of Zachary Paige.  As Marsh draws his pistol the pair are shot in the back from an open window by Gimpy armed with a rifle.  When the townspeople burst in and see Marsh's weapon unfired they believe Ruth Lawrence is responsible.

Gimpy and his band discover the hard way that in addition to starting an Indian uprising, Marsh wants the $130,000 in gold for himself alone.

Cast
 Gary Merrill as Brock Marsh / Zachary Paige  
 Wanda Hendrix as Ruth Lawrence 
 John Bromfield as Mike Daugherty  
 Noah Beery Jr. as "Gimpy" Joe Woods  
 Jay Silverheels as Black Buffalo  
 Fay Roope as John Lawrence  
 Howard Wendell as Judge Horatio Baker  
 Robert F. Simon as U.S. Marshal Whit Collins 
 James Griffith as Warren  
 Richard Webb as Frank Gibbs  
 Peter Whitney as Grimes  
 John War Eagle as War Cloud  
 Clayton Moore as Stone

Notes

External links
 
 
 
 

1954 films
1954 Western (genre) films
American Western (genre) films
American Civil War films
American Indian Wars films
1950s English-language films
Columbia Pictures films
Films directed by Ray Nazarro

1950s American films